Yelionka is a rural locality (a selo) in Starodubsky District, Bryansk Oblast, Russia. The population was 532 as of 2010. There are 5 streets.

Geography 
Yelionka is located 22 km southwest of Starodub (the district's administrative centre) by road. Solova is the nearest rural locality.

References 

Rural localities in Starodubsky District